The Bishop James Madison Society is a secret society of the College of William and Mary in Virginia. Students founded the society in the year 1812 as a tribute to the life of the late Bishop James Madison, eighth president of William and Mary and cousin to the U.S. president James Madison.  Like other secret societies at the college, the Bishop James Madison Society fell victim to the hostilities of the American Civil War when William and Mary was occupied by Union troops and was forced to close its doors.

In the twentieth century, William and Mary students along with Professor David L. Holmes revived the society and it has thrived since.  The society's activities seek to foster pride in the college community. The society attempts through various small and private means to recognize and thank the college's unsung heroes. Recent public activities include placing a welcome banner on Old Campus to welcome new students during Convocation and families on parents' weekend, hiding plastic Easter eggs filled with candy and interesting facts about the college throughout the campus, and sponsoring coffee dates designed to increase dialogue among students, administrators, and faculty members.  The society's most prominent activity is its "Last Lecture" Series, which honors one retiring faculty member each semester by inviting them to speak on issues of current social/academic importance.  The lecture takes place in the historic Wren Chapel during the last week of classes.

The Society is private in membership and public in its activities. During the college's annual commencement exercises, some graduating members identify their involvement by wearing medals featuring the society's symbol, an elongated quatrefoil.

See also
Collegiate secret societies in North America

References

College of William & Mary student life
Collegiate secret societies
Student societies in the United States
Student organizations established in 1812
1812 establishments in Virginia